Valentine's Day is a holiday celebrated on February 14.

Valentine's Day may also refer to:

Film and television
 Valentine's Day (2008 film), an Australian television comedy film
 Valentine's Day (2010 film), an American romantic comedy by Garry Marshall
 Valentine's Day (TV series), a 1964 American sitcom

Television episodes
 "Valentine's Day" (13 Reasons Why), 2020
 "Valentine's Day" (The Middle), 2010
 "Valentine's Day" (New Girl), 2012
 "Valentine's Day" (The Office), 2006
 "Valentine's Day" (Roseanne), 1991
 "Valentine's Day" (SpongeBob SquarePants), 2000
 "Valentine's Day" (Superstore), 2017

Music
 Valentine's Day (soundtrack), a soundtrack album from the 2010 film
 "Valentine's Day" (David Bowie song), 2013
 "Valentine's Day" (Faze song), 2008
 "Valentine's Day", a song by ABC from The Lexicon of Love, 1982
 "Valentine's Day", a song by Blood, Sweat & Tears from Blood, Sweat & Tears 4, 1971
 "Valentine's Day", a song by Bruce Springsteen from Tunnel of Love, 1987
 "Valentine's Day", a song by James Taylor from Never Die Young, 1988
 "Valentine's Day", a song by Klaus Nomi from Za Bakdaz, 2007
 "Valentine's Day", a song by LANY from Malibu Nights, 2018
 "Valentine's Day", a song by Linkin Park from Minutes to Midnight, 2007
 "Valentine's Day", a song by Marilyn Manson from Holy Wood (In the Shadow of the Valley of Death), 2000
 "Valentine's Day", a song by Solange from Sol-Angel and the Hadley St. Dreams, 2008
 "Valentine's Day", a song by Steve Earle from I Feel Alright, 1996

See also
 "Valentine Day", a song by Paul McCartney from McCartney, 1970
 Valentine Days, a Bollywood film of 2003
 "Valentine Days", a 2008 OVA episode of School Days
 Happy Valentine's Day (disambiguation)
 Saint Valentine's Day Massacre, a 1929 gangland murder